Tulad ng Dati may refer to:

 Tulad ng Dati (album), an album by Filipino rock band The Dawn
 Tulad ng Dati (film), a 2006 Filipino independent film